Hovhannes Tahmazyan (born on 11 January 1970) is a retired Armenian international footballer who played for Shirak and Mika.

Career statistics

International

References

External links
 
 Profile at ffa.am
 Profile at armfootball.tripod.com
 
 

Living people
1970 births
Armenian footballers
Armenia international footballers
FC Shirak players
FC Mika players
Armenian Premier League players
Place of birth missing (living people)
Association football defenders